Santiago Tilapa is a town inside municipality of Tianguistenco in Mexico State in Mexico. The town is bordered on the north Mirasol, south to Xalatlaco, east with Xalatlaco and west with Santiago Tianguistenco. This populated place was an indigenous settlement, there are persons with otomi language.

References

Populated places in the State of Mexico
Tianguistenco
Otomi settlements